Hirtomurex winckworthi is a species of sea snail, a marine gastropod mollusk in the family Muricidae, the murex snails or rock snails.

References

External links
 Oliverio M. (2008) Coralliophilinae (Neogastropoda: Muricidae) from the southwest Pacific. In: V. Héros, R.H. Cowie & P. Bouchet (eds), Tropical Deep-Sea Benthos 25. Mémoires du Muséum National d'Histoire Naturelle 196: 481–585, at p. 548.
 Kilburn R.N., Marais J.P. & Marais A.P. (2010) Coralliophilinae. pp. 272–292, in: Marais A.P. & Seccombe A.D. (eds), Identification guide to the seashells of South Africa. Volume 1. Groenkloof: Centre for Molluscan Studies. 376 pp.

Hirtomurex
Gastropods described in 1930